The 2013 CSIO Gijón was the 2013 edition of the Spanish official show jumping horse show, at Las Mestas Sports Complex in Gijón. It was held as CSIO 5*.

This edition of the CSIO Gijón was held between August 28 and September 2.

Nations Cup
The 2013 FEI Nations Cup of Spain was the sixth competition of the European Division 2 in the 2013 Furusiyya FEI Nations Cup and was held on Saturday, August 31, 2014.

The competition was a show jumping competition with two rounds. The height of the fences were up to 1.60 meters. The best eight teams of the eleven which participated were allowed to start in the second round. The competition was endowed with €67,000.

Gijón Grand Prix
The Gijón Grand Prix, the Show jumping Grand Prix of the 2014 CSIO Gijón, was the major show jumping competition at this event. The sponsor of this competition was Banco Sabadell Herrero. It was held on Monday 2 August 2013. The competition was a show jumping competition over two rounds, the height of the fences were up to 1.60 meters.

It was endowed with 145,000 €.

(Top 10 of 44 Competitors)

References

External links
Official website of CSIO Gijón
All results of the CSIO Gijón 2014

CSIO Gijón
2013 in show jumping
FEI Nations Cup